Everything About Mustafa is a 2004 Turkish drama thriller film written and directed by Çağan Irmak about a man forced to confront his past after he loses everything in an accident.

Plot 
Mustafa is a successful business man living a seemingly great life with his family when an accident takes it all away from him and leaves him with many questions and a cab driver, Fikret, who can answer it all. Mustafa is due to get a lot more than what he bargained for, however, as his interrogations take him to long-forgotten childhood memories and force him to see his formerly perfect life from a very different perspective.

Cast 
Fikret Kuşkan - Mustafa
Nejat İşler - Fikret
Başak Köklükaya - Ceren
Şerif Sezer - Mukadder
Zeynep Eronat - Selda
Borgahan Gümüşsoy - Young Mustafa

External links 
 

2004 films
Films set in Turkey
2000s Turkish-language films
2000s thriller films
Turkish thriller films
Films directed by Çağan Irmak